Jingulu, also spelt Djingili, is an Australian language spoken by the Jingili people in the Northern Territory of Australia, historically around the township of Elliot. The language is one of several languages of the West Barkly family. 

The Jingulu have (or had) a well-developed signed form of their language.

Background and location
Other languages spoken in the West Barkly family include Wambaya, Gudanji, Binbinka, and Ngarnka. When the Mudburra people arrived to the region where the Jingili live, a cultural fusion group arose named Kuwarrangu, while the Jingilu and Mudburra cultures still remained separate. Based on geographical proximity, the Jingili and other ethnic groups have related languages with common vocabulary.

Jingulu was historically spoken around the township of Elliot.

Speakers and status
Jingulu has an Ethnologue classification of moribund, meaning that it is an endangered language, with only between 10 and 15 speakers in 1997,[4] the youngest being in the fifties. An additional 20 people had some command of it. However, it was not used in daily communication which instead was conducted in either English or Kriol. In 2019 approximately five people still spoke the language, including Stuart Joel Nuggett, who has recorded music in Jingulu. The remaining speakers are elderly.

Sign language

The Jingulu have (or had) a well-developed signed form of their language.

Phonology

Vowels 
Jingulu has three basic vowel phoneme qualities, given in IPA in the following table. There are two high vowels, /i/ and /u/, and one low vowel /a/. /i/, /a/ and /u/ are front, central, and back, respectively. /u/ is rounded while /a/ and /i/ are unrounded.

While there are only three phonemically-distinct vowel phoneme qualities in Jingulu, the variations in vowel sounds are greater than in grammars with larger vowel phoneme inventories. These three phonemes have a variety of phonetic outputs depending on the word. The close vowel /i/ may be realized as [i], [ɨ] or [e]; the close vowel /u/ most commonly as [u], but also [o] and [ɔ]; and the open vowel /a/ as [a], [ʌ], [æ] and [ə].

Jingulu has contrastive vowel length. The orthographic convention of long high vowels is a two-syllable nuclei with a homorganic glide in between. In orthography, /aː/ appears as ⟨aa⟩, while the other two appear with a homorganic consonant, ⟨iyi⟩ and ⟨uwu⟩, respectively. Diphthongs in Jingulu are realized as separate syllable nuclei.

Vowel to long high vowel example:

Vowel to long low vowel example:

Diphthong example:

Vowel harmony 
An important feature of Jingulu's phonology is vowel harmony. Jingulu exhibits a regressive vowel harmony, which means that the vowels of nominal or verbal roots may be subject to change triggered by suffixes that contain a close vowel and that are directly adjacent to the root. The vowel harmony affects open vowels in the roots, which become close. Due to Jingulu's small inventory of vowels, it will always be the open vowel /a/ that is subject to change, always becoming /i/.[7] However, if vowel harmony is triggered and the root contains a close vowel, none of the open vowels to the left of the close vowel will be subject to change.

Consonants 
Jingulu has eighteen consonant phonemes, distributed across five places of articulation and five manners of articulation.

Note: rr represents a flapped or trilled rhotic

Noticeably, all places of articulation have a stop phoneme. The consonant inventory is typical of Australian languages, with a lack of phonologically distinct fricatives and affricates as well as absence of phonemic consonant germinates. One noteworthy aspect of Jingulu that is unusual for Australian grammars is that it does not have series of interdentals.

There is no concrete evidence that voicing is contrastive. There is only little evidence showing that the retroflex consonants are contrastive. Most speakers of Jingulu do not make a distinction between the retroflex consonants and their alveolar equivalents. Often they merely serve as allophones. However, there are a number of minimal pairs where there indeed is a distinction, for instance dirnd- "shoot" and dind- "grind"; mininmi"Acacia victoriae" and mirnirnmi "fire drill"; and walu "forehead" and warlu "burn scar."

The glides, [w] and [j], may be dropped word-initially, which is also true for [ŋ]. The latter may also be replaced by a glide.[10]

 widij- "to tie" may be realized as /widij-/ or /idij-/
 yidaangka "in a few days" may be realized as /jidaːŋka/ or /idaːŋka/

 ngirrm- "to make" may be realized as /ŋirm-/, /irm-/ or /jirm-/
 nguny- "to give" may be realized as /ŋuɲ-/, /uɲ-/ or /wuɲ-/

Syllable structure 
According to the grammar:

'C' = Consonant
'V' = Vowel
'L' = Highly sonorous consonant (i.e. liquids and glides)

The basic syllable structure in Jingulu is CV. CVC and CVLC are also permissible structures. The basic phonological unit is the open (CV) syllable when V is a long vowel, while the basic phonological unit is the closed (CVC) syllable when V is a short vowel. A phonotactic restriction of Jingulu is that rr and ly cannot be word-initial. The word-final phoneme is nearly always a vowel.

Consonant clusters are evidenced in the Jingulu syllable structure. Clusters may be word-final only if they consist of a sonorant and a [-nasal] plosive, in that order. The largest possible clusters are triconsonantal, consisting of a liquid, nasal, and stop, strictly in this order.  Furthermore, they must be placed word-internally.

Stress 
In Jingulu, only vowels can be stress bearing units (SBUs). For single morphemes, stress is predictable, landing on the penultimate SBU of a word. The final SBU is never stressed. This does not hold true for Jingulu words that come from the Pama-Nyungan languages of countries neighboring the Jingili. In general, however, Jingulu follows the following pattern:

 2 SBUs → stress on initial SBU
 3 SBUs → generally stress on second SBU
 4 SBUs → generally primary stress on third SBU, secondary stress on initial SBU
 5 SBUs → primary stress on penultimate or antepenultimate SBU, secondary stress on initial SBU
 6 SBUs → primary stress on antepenultimate SBU, secondary stress on initial SBU.

Long vowels and diphthongs have two SBUs, signifying that they do not exist as their own phoneme.

Morphology 
Jingulu has both prefixes and suffixes. Morphemes can sometimes stand alone as a word, such as with pronouns and certain cases of demonstratives and adverbials, but the majority of roots must have affixes. Both derivational and inflectional affixes can be found in the grammar.

Parts of speech 
Jingulu vocabulary can be split into three broad categories of parts of speech: nominal, verbal, and adverbial.

Nominal 
Nominals are modified/affixed with case marking and morphological discourse markings.

Verbal 
The minimum words required to form an acceptable sentence in Jingulu is a light verb and either a subject or a coverbal root.

Adverbial 
Aside from discourse markers, adverbs do not have affixation. In some cases, adverbs must exist immediately before coverbal roots.

Derivation 
Jingulu has derivational affixes of the type nominalisation and adverbialisation.

Nominalisation 
Jingulu has three nominalising affixes: -ajka, -ajkal, and -jbunji, the latter being very rare.

-ajka derives nouns from verbs, specifically a verb to the person who is undergoing the action denoted by the verb.

the action of eating     →     that which is eaten

-ajkal derives nouns from verbs, specifically verbs to represent someone or something that performs the verb.

the action of singing   →   that which is singing

-jbunji changes a root meaning to something that has the property associated with that root. This is a less used nominalising affix compared to the other two.

the action of spearing   →    that which has been speared

Adverbialisation 
Jingulu has two adverbialising affixes: -kaji and -nama.

-kaji is similar to 'really', 'right', or 'completely', indicating that the thing it is describing is done to its greatest extent.

forget →   completely forget

-nama can mean 'still', 'already', 'this time', 'in the time of...', and more. It is typically used to emphasize that the root it is affixing is happening over time.

went  →   already went

Nominals 
The major uses of affixation in Jingulu are found in the expression of demonstratives, as well as the nominal features pronouns, case, number, and (in)definiteness discussed in the next section.

Demonstratives 
Jingulu has three kinds of demonstratives: referential, anaphoric and cataphoric. In Jingulu, the referential demonstratives, of which there are about five sets, refer to objects that may be distal or proximal, and may be translated as "this" or "that." The anaphoric demonstratives, of which there is one set, refer to something that is already known by the speaker and listener at the time of speaking, and may be translated as "this (you know)" or "that (you know)." Finally, the cataphoric demonstrative, of which there is only one, refers to something that is not yet known by both the speaker and listener and is to be introduced, and may be translated as "this (which you are to know about)" or "that (which you are to know about)."

As the demonstratives are considered nominals, most of them belong to one of the four nominal classes.[12]

Referential 
There are five sets of referential demonstratives: jama and jimi; nyam-; ngin- and nyin-; ngunu; and ngunungku. The first three sets are all by default distal, but may be made proximal by the use of the suffix -(r)niki. None of the last two sets may take the proximal marker, as ngunu is always considered distal, and ngunungku is generally considered proximal, normally translated as "this way."[13]

These demonstratives vary based on gender and animacy. The demonstrative jama belongs to the masculine class, and jimi to the neuter class. However, jama may refer to nominals of all classes, and jimi may also refer to nominals of the vegetable class.[14 The demonstrative nyam- takes either the suffix -a, -arni- or -bala depending on whether it refers to a nominal of the masculine, feminine, or neuter or vegetable class, respectively.  Likewise, the demonstratives ngin- and nyin- take the suffix -da, -a or -i depending on whether it refers to a nominal of the masculine, feminine or neuter class, respectively, and become ngima and nyima when referring to a nominal of the vegetable class, respectively. While a nyam- demonstrative takes the proximal marker, it becomes nyamarniki no matter class.[16] The demonstrative ngunu belongs to the neuter class, but may also refer to nominals of the vegetable class. ngunungku may refer to nominals of all classes.

(jimi is neuter)

(jimi is neuter + -niki modifier)

(jama is masculine)

(jamaniki is masculine + -niki modifier)

(nyama is masculine)

(nginda is masculine)

(ngini is neuter + -niki modifier)

(nyina is feminine)

(ngunu is neuter)

(ngunungku is "this way")

Anaphoric 
Anaphoric/discourse demonstratives refer to the aforementioned. There is one set of anaphoric demonstratives: kuna and kuya. These are only used rarely, and are often replaced by referential demonstratives. The former refers to nominals of the masculine class, and the latter to nominals of the neuter class. However, the former may also refer to nominals of other classes, and the latter to nominals of the vegetable class as well.

(kuyu is neuter)

(kuna is neuter)

Cataphoric 
The only cataphoric demonstrative is jiyi and refers to nominals of all classes.

Nominal features

Gender 
All nominals in Jingulu belong to a certain gender or class of which there are four: masculine, feminine, neuter and vegetable. The vegetable class is the smallest of the classes with fewest nominals. Next comes the feminine class, and then the neuter and the masculine classes.

The characteristic endings of nominals belonging to the vegetable class are -imi and -ibi. Most nominals of this class are long, thin, pointed or sharp objects. For instance, a lot of vegetables, body parts, instruments and weather phenomena. Examples include wardbardbumi "bush passionfruit," mankijbi "back of neck" and kingmi "rainbow."

The characteristic endings for feminine nominals are -ini, -irni, -idi and -irdi. Most nominals of this class are female animates, different kinds of axes, the sun, as well as for most smaller songbirds, and many unusual animals. Examples include nambiliju "female body," dardawurni "axe" and lirrikbirni "cockatoo."

The characteristic ending for masculine nominals is -a, although a lot of masculine nominals also end in a consonant. Most nominals of this class are animates, although it also contains a number of flat or rounded inanimates. Examples include jambilija "male body," kiyinarra "vagina" and yarrulan "youth."

Finally, the characteristic ending for neuter nominals is -u. This class contains nominals that do not fall into any of the previous classes, and especially words for abstract concepts and entities. Examples include yurrku "nectar," ngabarangkurru "blood" and karala "ground."[11]

Number 
Jingulu utilizes number morphology based on three numbers: singular, dual, and plural. The dual number is represented by the suffix /-bila/, and the plural number is represented by the suffix /-bala/, but they have different phonetic realizations depending on the allomorph used in context.

(bila refers to the number of brothers, dual)                      

(bala refers to the number of people, plural)

Case 
Case is realized in core and semantic case markings. Core case marking includes the ergative case ([-ka]/ [-nga] for feminine kin terms/feminine nominals and [-rni] for other nominals) and the dative case (/-rna/). Semantic/adpositional case markings include the instrumental case to mark inanimate subjects of transitive clauses (/-(w)arndi/, with the rare exception [-marndi]). Semantic/adpositional case markings function differently from core markings; it adds more information to the word it is affixing by actually referencing a location, direction, or some other aspect.

Ergative case:

Dative case:

Semantic/adpositional case:

Instrumental case:

Reduplication 
In addition to affixation, reduplication is another morphophonological process of Jingulu. The reduplication pattern in Jingulu is internal reduplication, typically of the first VC(C) syllable structure in the root, which is then infixed.

 mardilyi → mardardilyi
 lame → lame folks

 imikirni → imimikirni
 old woman → old women

Syntax 
Jingulu has free word order, therefore no basic word order can be established. Jingulu is syntactically classified as a Non-configurational language. The predicate (both argument and verb) of a clause will lack encyclopedic information.[21]

The following simple Jingulu sentences are all acceptable versions of the same phrase to native speakers:

Simple sentences

Verbless clauses 
Verbless clauses lack an overt verb, normally compensating for this with two nominal elements that act as clausal predicates in its place. In syntax, verbless clauses are typically realized so that one nominal refers to the subject, while the referent of that nominal serves as the predicate, usually realized in subject-predicate order. Predicates in verbless clauses can be adjectives or nouns, possessors, adpositionals, or adverbs.

Verbless clause example:

Adverb placement 
Adverbs are one of the few word types that hold a strong preference for certain sentence positions with respect to the verb or to clause boundaries, depending on the type of adverb. Adverbs of time are typically sentence-initial, adverbs of place are typically at either the beginning or end of the sentence, and manner adverbs are placed before the verb most often.

Adposition + noun phrase example:

Complex sentences 
Word order is also free for complex sentences. Complex sentences in Jingulu can be split into two categories: coordinate and subordinate structures.

Coordinate structures 
Coordinate structures are found in complex sentences in which the tense of the two clauses is absolutive; i.e. the event associated with each refer to time of utterance. The two clauses may or may not occur at the same time, but they should not be reliant on one another in their occurrence.

Coordinate structure example:

Subordinate structures 
Subordinate structures are found in complex sentences in which the two clauses are reliant on one another, the first being the tense-determining main clause and the second being the dependent subordinate clause. The structure of these sentences can be implemented in two ways: the tense may be indicated by eliminating the core verb, or the core verb may remain but with tense features determined based on the event time of the main clause rather than the utterance time.

Subordinate structures example (purpose clause):

Text example 

Kamamurra Marluka

Bundurrunu umbumami ngarnu jamirnani marlukarni, bundundurru marriya, angkula wumbumaardi kamamurra. Kamamurra jamarni marlukarni narnangajarriya biyurlarruni, kaminjirru kularrani. Kaminjirru kulayarni ngarnu ngajanarriya bundundurru marliya. Nginirni bundurru ngabangarriyi ngarni ngindirna marlukarna. Bubujirna marlukarna ngabangarriyi ngarnu bundurrunu ngunyangarriyi, ngambaya manyan kaya bundundurra.

The Old Blind Man

Be so kind as to cook that old man some food, he can't cook because he's blind. That old blind man is looking about for his children, perhaps his grandchildren or nephews. Our young people look after our feeding when we are sick. I'll take some food to that old man. I'll take this food over and give it to the old white-haired man so that he can have a sleep once he's full up.

References

Notes

General

Bibliography

External links 
 Features of the Jingulu language on WALS
 Resources for the Jingulu language on OLAC
 Listen to Gospel Messages in Jingulu on Global Recordings
 Bibliography of Jingulu people and language resources, at the Australian Institute of Aboriginal and Torres Strait Islander Studies

Mirndi languages
Endangered indigenous Australian languages in the Northern Territory